Lullabies & Sleepless Nights (Ambient Guitar Noise: Volume 2)  is the third studio album by King Never founder Matt McCabe, and a return to form of his solo ambient music guitar looping explorations. Released by Marathon Records on January 1, 2007.

Background 

After working with collaborators and venturing into the more progressive rock feel of 2004's Orphans, Misfits & Fragments, on the 10 year anniversary of Ambient Guitar Noise: Volume 1, with a title inspired by his children, McCabe again solos live with no overdubbing to release this sequel effort.

Reception
AmbientMusicGuide.com said about the release: "I don't know whether "purist" is the word but Californian ambient guitarist King Never takes pride in choosing the riskier path of recording his tracks live, with no further editing or overdubs. With his electric guitar, effects and loop machines he creates a seductive and surprisingly broad palate of nocturnal sounds on Lullabies And Sleepless Nights. It's beatless and mostly gentle, shifting between tonal and slightly dissonant. There's the odd burst of jagged distortion just in case, I presume, you've nodded off too early. This is often impressive and eerily beautiful stuff and not just for guitar fans by any means. Rating 3.5/5."

Track listing 

 Some Kind of Beginning – 0:28
 First Light – 4:14
 Beautifully Broken – 3:18
 The Quiet Hour – 6:52
 Interrupted – 1:24
 The End of Never – 4:26
 Things to Come – 2:54
 Chaos of Day Fades To Night – 5:34
 Almost Asleep – 4:24
 Night of A Thousand Worries – 9:30

Production notes 

Released January 1, 2007.
Special thanks to John Aycock at Voodoo Lab.
Recorded, mixed and mastered by Matt McCabe at Finley Sound, somewhere in Northern California, USA.
Original artwork “Airplanes” by Weston D. McCabe

References

External links 
 Album info on KingNever.com
 Allmusic.com - Lullabies & Sleepless Nights (Ambient Guitar Noise: Volume 2)

2007 albums
King Never albums